Ramón Martínez Pérez (6 February 1929 – 6 January 2017), also known as Ramoní, was a Spanish footballer. He played as a midfielder for Sevilla and Granada of La Liga. He also played for CD Málaga and made two appearances for the national team in 1952.

Martínez Pérez died on 6 January 2017 at the age of 87.

References

External links
 

1929 births
2017 deaths
Spanish footballers
Association football midfielders
Footballers from Melilla
Spain international footballers
Sevilla FC players
Granada CF footballers
Málaga CF players